Kevin Ellis may refer to:
 Kevin Ellis (rugby) (born 1965), Welsh rugby league and rugby union footballer
 Sir Kevin Ellis (politician) (1908–1975), Liberal member of the New South Wales Legislative Assembly
 Kevin Ellis (skeleton racer) (born 1973), American skeleton racer
 Kevin Ellis (Australian rules footballer) (born 1944), Australian footballer
 Kevin Ellis (footballer, born 1977), English footballer
 Kevin Ellis (soccer, born 1991), American soccer player
 Kevin Ellis (True Blood)